Tak In-suk (born 25 April 1949) is a North Korean speed skater. She competed in two events at the 1972 Winter Olympics.

References

External links
 

1949 births
Living people
North Korean female speed skaters
Olympic speed skaters of North Korea
Speed skaters at the 1972 Winter Olympics
Place of birth missing (living people)